Sichuan International Studies University (SISU)  is a public research university in Chongqing, China. It is one of the top eight foreign studies universities in China.

It is the flagship university for foreign language education and information consultancy in southwest China. According to the latest Wu Shulian Chinese Universities Rankings, Sichuan International Studies University is ranked No. 4 among Chinese international studies universities.

History
It was founded as the Russian Training School of Southwest Military University of People's Liberation Army (PLA) in May 1950. It is the only university specialized in foreign language studies in the southwest region of China. Due to its close relationship with the Chinese Ministry of Foreign Affairs, it is one of the ministry's few target schools.

The development of SISU has been highlighted with 6 important dates: 
April, 1950 - founding of the “PLA’s Russian Training Corps of Southwest University of Military and Political Sciences” with the support of Deng Xiaoping, Liu Bocheng, He Hong and other founding fathers of the People’s Republic of China. 
January, 1951 - renamed as the “Russian Training Brigade of No.2 Senior Infantry School of the PLA.”
November 1952 - renamed as the “Russian Department of Southwest People’s Revolutionary University.” 
March 1953 - renamed as “Southwest Russian College.” 
May 1959 -  renamed as “Sichuan Institute of Foreign Languages”. 
May 1990 - renamed as “Sichuan International Studies University”.

Students

The majority of domestic students took liberal arts only curriculums in high school. Out of 12,000 registered students, 8,000 enrolled in four-year and three-year undergraduate programs; 2,500 are in adult and continuing education programs; while the rest are in short-term training programs.

Programmes
Foreign language programmes offered include Portuguese, Russian, English, Spanish, French, Italian, German, Korean, Japanese, Hungarian, Hebrew, Thai, Vietnamese, Burmese and Arabic.

Non-language specialties have been added to its curriculum, such as law, journalism, Chinese as a foreign language, advertising, and tourism management.

Several master's degree programs have been offered, for example, Portuguese, Russian Language and Literature, English Language and Literature, French Language and Literature, German Language and Literature, Japanese Language and Literature, Comparative Literature and World Literature, etc. Doctor's degree programs have been offered.

Campus
SISU main campus is in Shapingba, Chongqing, at the foothill of the Mount Gele and by the Jialing River, with an area of 770,000 square meters. The award-winning campus has been recognized as a "Garden Institution" by the Chongqing Municipal government for its green spaces.

Main academic departments
Reference:

 Postgraduate Department
 Graduate Institute of Interpretation and Translation
 English Department
 International Cultural Exchanges College
 Department of English Language and Culture
 International Business School
 School of Journalism and Communications
 Department of Russian
 Department of French and Italian
 Department of German
 Department of Spanish/Portuguese Language and Culture
 Eastern Languages College
 Department of Chinese Language and Literature
 College of Applied Foreign Languages
 Department of Physical Education
 Department of Social Sciences
 Adult Education Institute
 Intensive Language Training Center
 College of Interpretation and Translation

References

External links 
Sichuan International Studies University website (Chinese, English, French, Spanish, German, Janpanese and Korean)

Universities and colleges in Chongqing
Educational institutions established in 1950
1950 establishments in China